Timeliopsis is a genus of bird in the family Meliphagidae. 
It contains the following species:
 Olive straightbill (Timeliopsis fulvigula)
 Tawny straightbill (Timeliopsis griseigula)

 
Bird genera
Taxonomy articles created by Polbot